Kiraz Mevsimi is a Turkish drama series ran on Fox TV. It is also dubbed in Arabic in the Middle East on MBC 4, Urdu in Pakistan on ARY Zindagi, Indonesian in Indonesia on Trans TV and in Italian in Italy on Canale 5.

Plot
Öykü's biggest dream is to become a successful fashion designer. She lives with her mother (Meral) and little brother Cem (Can). She's been in love with her best friend Burçu's brother Mete since childhood. But Mete does not feel the same. One day, Mete falls in love with Öykü's selfish friend Seyma, so Öykü gives up on Mete. Öykü then accidentally meets Mete's best friend and business partner Ayaz Dincer. Ayaz is a very handsome man, he falls in love with Öykü right away and even if she pushes him away, he keeps coming back. One day Burcu, Öykü’s friend, sends a box of chocolates and a love note to her brother, but she signs it with Öykü's name. When Öykü finds out, she runs to Mete's office to take the present with the note before he sees it. When she arrives, Ayaz has already seen the present and is shocked to see it come from Oyku, he discovers that the girl he likes is in love with his best friend. In that moment Mete arrives and asks who that gift is for. Öykü, ashamed and afraid of his reaction, says that she brought the gift for Ayaz and tells Mete that she's in love with his friend, but of course it's a lie. So Ayaz and Öykü pretend to be a couple, until they start falling in love for real.

Cast
 Özge Gürel as Öykü Acar
 Serkan Çayoğlu as Ayaz Dinçer
 Dağhan Külegeç as Mete Uyar 
 Nilperi Şahinkaya as Şeyma Çetin
 Fatma Toptaş as Sibel Korkmaz
 Serkan Börekyemez as İlker Korkmaz
 Nihal Işıksaçan as Burcu Uyar 
 Aras Aydın as Emre Yiğit
 Neslihan Yeldan as Önem Dinçer
 Ayşegül Ünsal as Meral Acar
 Nezih Cihan Aksoy as Olcay
 Tamer Berke Sarıkaya as Cem Acar
 Hakan Çimenser as Bülent Uyar
 Atilla Saral as Mehmet Karaylı
 Hasan Şahintürk as Kemal Acar
 Jale Arıkan as Monika Sessa
 Ozgur Cevik as Derin Aydın

Series overview

International broadcasting

References

External links 

 
 
 Kiraz Mevsimi BeyazPerde.com
 Kiraz Mevsimi Sinematurk.com
 Kiraz Mevsimi Sinemalar.com

2014 Turkish television series debuts
Turkish drama television series
2015 Turkish television series endings
Fox (Turkish TV channel) original programming
Television series produced in Istanbul
Television shows set in Istanbul
Television series set in the 2010s
Turkish television series endings